The 2015–16 NCAA Division I men's ice hockey season began in October 2015 and ended with the 2016 NCAA Division I men's ice hockey tournament's championship game on April 9, 2016. This was the 69th season in which an NCAA ice hockey championship was held, and the 122nd year overall in which an NCAA school fielded a team.

On January 22, 2016, Boston College coach Jerry York became the first NCAA hockey coach to win 1,000 games and only the second coach in the professional or amateur level to achieve 1,000 wins. The only other coach to achieve this feat was Scotty Bowman.

Polls

Regular season

Standings

2016 NCAA tournament

Note: * denotes overtime period(s)

Player stats

Scoring leaders

GP = Games played; G = Goals; A = Assists; Pts = Points; PIM = Penalty minutes

Leading goaltenders

GP = Games played; Min = Minutes played; W = Wins; L = Losses; T = Ties; GA = Goals against; SO = Shutouts; SV% = Save percentage; GAA = Goals against average

Awards

NCAA

Atlantic Hockey

Big Ten

ECAC

Hockey East

NCHC

WCHA

Hobey Baker Award

Mike Richter Award

See also
 2015–16 NCAA Division II men's ice hockey season
 2015–16 NCAA Division III men's ice hockey season

References

 
NCAA